Cornwall-Meadowbank is a provincial electoral district for the Legislative Assembly of Prince Edward Island, Canada. It was previously known as North River-Rice Point.

The riding consists of the Town of Cornwall, the Community of Meadowbank and a small section of the Community of Clyde River.

Members
The riding has elected the following Members of the Legislative Assembly:

Election results

Cornwall-Meadowbank, 2007–present

2016 electoral reform plebiscite results

North River-Rice Point, 1996–2007

References

External links
 Cornwall-Meadowbank information

Prince Edward Island provincial electoral districts